Henchir-Bel-Aït is a locality and archaeological site in Tunisia.
The ruins are of the Roman era civitas of Tepela. The ruins include several columaide temples. 

The town of Tepela was also the seat of a small Roman Bishopric, which survives today as a titular Bishopric of the Roman Catholic Church, and the current bishop is Daniel Anthony Hart.

References

Populated places in Tunisia
Catholic titular sees in Africa